The Zero Deficit Budget (ZDB) is a financial strategy laid out by Minister of Finance Ken Kandodo of Malawi under the Bingu wa Mutharika administration that is based on zero-based budgeting. This is a new approach to economic financial budgeting for 'least developed countries' where the government aims to finance all the recurrent expenditures using its own domestic resources. Kandodo mentioned that this new ZDB is based on several consultations and studies, he did not cite any country on which he will model the zero-deficit budget approach nor a successfully executed Zero Deficit budget.

Economics Association of Malawi notes that although the budget is based on four important cornerstones: "global economic outlook; MGDS priorities; fiscal discipline with clearly spelt expenditure controls; and  budget reform measures of zero-budget, Medium Term Expenditure Framework , and prioritising allocation of resources towards revenue generating areas" it also a calculated financial risk.

According to the Malawi Knowledge Network, the budget statement highlights  milestones that Malawi has achieved such as unprecedented economic growth rates, single rate inflation, reduced bank rate and a stable Malawi Kwacha. It also highlighter advancement in terms of food security, HIV/AIDS, maternal and infant mortality and infrastructure development.

Features:
Finance all public recurrent expenditure using its own domestic resources without any recourse to either domestic or foreign borrowing or cuts in public service delivery.
Projects will be mobilized unless resources backing up those expenditures have been received.
Import duty on photocopier machines, cigars and other tobacco substitutes have gone up by more than 100%.
limits on goods allowed from export processing zones (EPZs).
Allocation to support the education sector received the bulk of the budget followed by the agriculture and food security sector.

Former finance minister of Malawi Friday Jumbe noted that "the concept in itself is not bad, but that the move seems to be reactionary to potential donor freeze." He also noted that social sectors like education and health will be the most affected by these austerity measures.

Critics
The budget has left financial analysts wondering how government will "eliminate deficits in one part of the budget (recurrent), but leave the other (development) unbalanced and still call the whole plan deficit-free".
Opposition parties argue that the budget will hurt ordinary Malawians and stifle the private sector since it also imposes tax increases on ordinary goods.

References

External links
Malawi's Zero Deficit Budget Statement

Politics of Malawi
Budgets